Angelo Anthony Lonardo (January 21, 1911 − March 31, 2006) was a mobster who became the acting boss of the Cleveland crime family in the early 1980s.

Lonardo was born in 1911 in Cleveland to Joseph and Concetta Lonardo. His godfather was Anthony Milano. After his father was murdered by a member of the Porrello crime family in 1927, 16-year-old Lonardo swore revenge and murdered Salvatore Todaro with his cousin Dominic Sospirato. Lonardo was tried and sentenced to life in prison. However, his lawyer was able to get a second trial and he was discharged and released. He later joined Milano's brother Frank in the Cleveland crime family. He eventually worked his way up to underboss in 1976. After his arrest in 1983, Lonardo became a government informant and testified against his former colleagues and several mob figures throughout the US. Lonardo and Jimmy Fratianno, the acting boss of the Los Angeles crime family, were the highest-ranking mobsters to become federal witnesses until Gambino underboss Sammy "the Bull" Gravano during the early 1990s. He eventually went into the federal witness protection program, but left it to return to Cleveland. Lonardo died in his sleep on April 1, 2006, aged 95. He was buried in Calvary Cemetery in Cleveland.

References

Porrello, Rick. To Kill the Irishman: The War that Crippled the Mafia. Novelty, Ohio: Next Hat Press, 2004. 
Vigil, Vicki Blum (2007). Cemeteries of Northeast Ohio: Stones, Symbols & Stories. Cleveland, OH: Gray & Company, Publishers. 

 

1911 births
2006 deaths
People from Cleveland
American crime bosses
American gangsters of Sicilian descent
Cleveland crime family
Federal Bureau of Investigation informants
People who entered the United States Federal Witness Protection Program
Burials in Calvary Cemetery (Cleveland)